The Rohrbach Ro VIII Roland was an airliner produced in Germany during the 1920s. It was a conventional strut-braced, high-wing monoplane, based loosely on the Zeppelin-Staaken E-4/20 that Adolf Rohrbach designed in 1920. It had a fully enclosed flight deck and passenger cabin, and featured fixed, tailskid undercarriage. Power was supplied by three engines, one in the nose, and two mounted in nacelles on the wings. Construction was of metal throughout.

Design and development
In 1926 Deutsche Luft Hansa purchased the prototype Roland, followed by five production examples over that year and the next. The production machines were built with open flight decks, although they were later enclosed, as on the prototype. These were put to work servicing a route between Berlin and London via Hanover and Amsterdam. At different times, the Roland held twenty-two world records.

In 1928, Luft Hansa replaced three of its Rolands with new machines of slightly different design. Designated Ro VIIIa, these had a fuselage that was stretched by 30 cm (1 ft) and were powered by the more powerful BMW V engines in place of the BMW IVs fitted to the prototype and first production batch. A new Spanish airline, Iberia, purchased the three Rolands that Luft Hansa retired, and put them into service on its inaugural service between Madrid and Barcelona.

In 1929, Rohrbach produced nine examples of a substantially updated Roland for Luft Hansa. These featured a major redesign of the flight deck, and a new wing design. Dubbed the Roland II, these aircraft continued in service with the airline until 1936 on its Hamburg–Malmö and Berlin–Munich routes. Luft Hansa sold at least three of these aircraft to Deruluft upon retirement. The Luftwaffe acquired another one, armed it, and operated it at the clandestine school at Lipetsk to train bomber crews.

During his 1932 election campaign, Adolf Hitler hired a Rohrbach Ro VIII Roland aeroplane from Deutsche Luft Hansa for his two first series of campaign flights in March and July. The aeroplane was named Immelmann I after World War I pilot Max Immelmann. Hitler switched to a Ju 52 in November 1932.

Popular culture
The Spanish amusement park Tibidabo (Barcelona) got a real-size replica of that plane, painted red. It is the most famous ride in the park, opened on September 23, 1928, sometimes referred to as "the first flight simulator in the world", and called "L'avió" (Catalan for "the plane").

Variants
Data from:German Aviation 1919 - 1945
Ro VIII Roland IInitial version powered by three  BMW IV 6-cylinder in-line water-cooled engines.
Ro VIIIa Roland Ia Three aircraft purchased by Deutsche Luft Hansa, with a  fuselage stretch, powered by three  BMW V 6-cylinder in-line water-cooled engines.
Ro VIII Roland II A significantly up-graded version for Deutsche Luft Hansa, with revised cockpit and re-designed wing, powered by three BMW V engines; nine built.

Specifications (Ro VIIIa Roland Ia)

References

External links

Rohrbach Ro VIII Roland

1920s German airliners
Roland
High-wing aircraft
Trimotors
Aircraft first flown in 1926